Ian James Bryans (February 3, 1953 – August 1, 2015) was a Canadian football player who played for the Toronto Argonauts, Hamilton Tiger-Cats and Edmonton Eskimos. He previously played football at the University of Western Ontario.

References

1953 births
2015 deaths
Edmonton Elks players
Western Mustangs football players